Zunongwangia atlantica is a Gram-negative and rod-shaped bacterium from the genus of Zunongwangia which has been isolated from the deep-sea wate from the Atlantic Ocean.

References

Flavobacteria
Bacteria described in 2014